The 1st Space Brigade is a United States Army unit. Assigned to the United States Army Space and Missile Defense Command, it is responsible for providing space combat power support to Army units. Activated in 2005 as a TOE unit after being provisionally active since 2003, it is headquartered at Colorado Springs, Colorado.

The 1st Space Brigade (Provisional) was activated in May 2003, with the 1st Space Battalion, the 1st Satellite Control Battalion (later to become the 53rd Signal Battalion), and the 193rd Space Battalion (Colorado Army National Guard). Since 2019, five missile defense batteries have been assigned to 1st Space Brigade including two in Japan and one each in Israel, Turkey, and Qatar.

The mission of 1st Space Brigade is to "conduct continuous, global space support, space control and space force enhancement operations in support of U.S. Strategic Command and Supported Combatant Commanders enabling the delivery of decisive combat power."

53rd Signal Battalion (SATCON) conducts payload and transmission control of the Defense Satellite Communications System and Wideband Global Satellite Communications System constellations.

Friendly force tracking (actually tracking both friend or foe) is one of the basic functions of the SMDC.

Structure 
The brigade is composed of the following battalions and separate batteries:
 1st Space Battalion, Fort Carson, Colorado
 2nd Space Battalion, Colorado
 10th Missile Defense Battery, Shariki, Japan
 11th Missile Defense Battery, Turkey 
 12th Missile Defense Battery, Saudi Arabia
 13th Missile Defense Battery, Israel
 14th Missile Defense Battery, Kyogamisaki, Japan 

The 117th Space Battalion, Colorado Army National Guard has a training, readiness, and oversight (TRO) relationship with the 1st Space Brigade but is not actually part of it, as of 2021.

List of commanders 

 COL Timothy R. Coffin, 27 July 2006
 COL Jeffrey A. Farnsworth, 10 July 2008
 COL Eric P. Henderson, 30 June 2010
 COL James R. Meisinge, July 2012
 COL Thomas L. James, 11 July 2014
 COL Richard Zellmann, 21 June 2016
 COL Eric D. Little, 13 July 2018
 COL Brian C. Bolio, 1 July 2020
 LTC Whitney Hall, ~2020 (acting)
 COL Donald K. Brooks, 5 March 2021

See also 
 U.S. Army Satellite Operations Brigade

References

SMDC DCG-O
Space Soldiers ready to defend the homeland against threats from the sky   Sgt. Zachary Sheely, 100th Missile Defense Brigade  (August 17, 2018) 
Army Space Support Teams (ARSSTs) from the Colorado Army National Guard’s 117th Space Support Battalion 

Brigades of the United States Army
Space units and formations of the United States Army
Military units and formations established in 2005